Ulmus 'Clusius'  is a Dutch hybrid elm cultivar raised at the Dorschkamp Research Institute for Forestry & Landscape Planning, Wageningen, and released to commerce in 1983. 'Clusius' was derived from a crossing of the same Dutch clones that produced the fastigiate 'Lobel' released in 1973: '202' ('Exoniensis' × U. wallichiana) and '336' ('Bea Schwarz' selfed).

Description

The tree has a broader crown than its siblings', whilst the generally obovate leaves, < 11 cm long by 7 cm wide, are less acuminate at the apex. Like 'Lobel', the tree flushes markedly later than most other elms, and is rarely in full leaf before mid-May.

Pests and diseases
Consequently, sales in the Netherlands declined from over 8,000 in 1979 to 600 in 2004.

Cultivation
While 'Clusius' remains for sale in Europe, its planting where the disease remains prevalent cannot be recommended. 'Clusius' featured in New Zealand government trials during the 1990s at the Hortresearch station, Palmerston North, but is not known to have been introduced to North America.

Etymology
The cultivar is named for Carolus Clusius, a Dutch naturalist of the Renaissance.

Accessions
Europe
Arboretum de La Petite Loiterie , Monthodon, France. No details available
Grange Farm Arboretum, Sutton St James, Spalding, Lincs., UK. Acc. no. 817.
Sir Harold Hillier Gardens, Ampfield, Romsey, Hampshire, UK. Acc. no: 2019.0441
Wijdemeren City Council, Netherlands. Elm Collection. planted mainly in Kortenhoef since 2006.

Nurseries
Noordplant , Glimmen, Netherlands.

References

Hybrid elm cultivar
Ulmus articles with images
Ulmus